XX Years Live is the 14th release, and second live album, from American Christian rock band Resurrection Band (known at this time as "REZ"), released in 1992.

Recording history
A double-CD set, XX Years Live was recorded in March of that same year at the Copernicus Center Theatre in Chicago, to celebrate 20 years of music ministry.  The concert features at least one song from every REZ release, and in addition, Glenn Kaiser and his wife and co-lead singer, Wendi Kaiser, take a few minutes each to speak to the audience.

Track listing
Track listing adapted from AllMusic

Disc one
  "Introduction/Waves" – 2:49
  "Military Man" – 3:29
  "Afrikaans" – 3:02
  "Attention" – 3:47
  "Colours" – 3:36
  "Players" – 3:25
  "The Struggle" – 3:50
  "Fiend or Foul" – 5:00
  "Alienated" – 2:00
  "Paint a Picture" – 4:26
  "Wendi's Rap" – 4:43
  "Right on Time" – 5:10
  "Love Comes Down" – 3:25
  "White Noise" – 5:09

Disc two
  "My Jesus Is All" – 4:42
  "Lovespeak" – 3:25
  "In Your Arms" – 3:36
  "Bargain" – 4:50
  "Shadows" – 4:47
  "Somebody to Love" – 2:50
  "Every Time It Rains" – 4:29
  "Where Roses Grow" – 9:12
  "Light/Light" – 4:00
  "Glenn's Rap" – 5:56
  "I Will Do My Last Singing in this Land, Somewhere" – 4:27

Personnel
 Glenn Kaiser - vocals, guitar
 Wendi Kaiser - vocals
 Stu Heiss - guitar, keyboards
 Roy Montroy - bass guitar, keyboards
 John Herrin - drums
 Hilde Bialach - keyboards
 Willie Kemp - keyboards
 Steve Eisen - saxophone

Production
 REZ – producers
 Tom Cameron – producer
 Ed Bialach – engineer
 Roy Montroy – engineer
 Roger Heiss – engineer
 Steve Hall – mastering

References

Resurrection Band albums
1992 live albums